Colonel General Hikmatulla Kuchkarovich Tursunov is an Uzbek military officer who is the former Minister of Defence of Uzbekistan from 1997 to 2000.

Career Timeline
Joined the Soviet Army (1973)
Graduated from the Tashkent Higher All-Arms Command School (1977)
Graduated from the Malinovsky Military Armored Forces Academy (1989)
First Deputy Head of the Border Guard Service of the National Security Service of Uzbekistan (1995–1996)
Head of the Border Guard Directorate of the National Security Service of Uzbekistan (1996–1997)
Deputy Defence Minister (1997)
Minister of Defense of Uzbekistan (1997–2000)

References

1953 births
Living people
Military personnel from Tashkent
Defence Ministers of Uzbekistan
Tashkent Higher All-Arms Command School alumni